The list of Lithuanian gods is reconstructed based on scarce written sources and late folklore. Lithuania converted to Christianity in 1387, but elements of Lithuanian mythology survived into the 19th century. The earliest written sources, authored by foreigners and Christians, only briefly mention the Lithuanian gods. Beginning in the 16th century, the pagan religion received more attention from authors, but often their accounts were confused, contradictory, and heavily influenced by various religious agendas. Collection and recording of folklore began in the 19th century, by which time the pagan mythology had become fragmented and mixed with Christian traditions. The cults of old deities transformed into folklore (individual tales, myths, songs, etc.) without associated rituals. Because of such difficulties obtaining data, there is no accepted list of Lithuanian gods. Different authors present wildly contradictory reconstructions of the Lithuanian pantheon.

Names from folklore myths and legends
This section includes the names of gods, divine or demonic beings, and other personages from Lithuanian myths, legends, folklore, and fairy-tales.

Gods and goddesses 
 Ašvieniai, the divine twins who pulled the chariot of the Sun (the Vedic Ashwins).
Aušrinė, the Morning Star, a goddess, a daughter of the  God ("dievaitė"). She was the goddess of the morning. Alternatively her name is given as Aušra ("dawn"). Ushas in Vedic religion.
Auštaras (Auštra), the god of the northeast wind, who stands at the gates of paradise and lights the way for those going to paradise. His function of shining this beacon makes him similar to Aušrinė; some consider him to be her cousin.
Bangpūtys, the god of the seas and storms ––he is two-faced like the Roman god Janus.
Dalia, goddess of fate and weaving.
Deivės Valdytojos (Lithuanian: Governing Goddesses), were the goddesses who made garments from human's lives. They were seven sisters: Verpiančioji (who spun the threads of life), Metančioji (who threw rims of life), Audėja (the weaver), Gadintoja (who broke the thread), Sergėtoja (who scolded Gadintoja, and instigated war between people), Nukirpėja (who cut the cloth of life), and Išskalbėja (the laundress). They have similarities with the Greek Fates and the Norse Norns. Deivės Valdytojos were associated with Dalia and Laima.
Dievas, ("God"), the supreme deity
Dievas Senelis ("God Old Man"), a teacher of people and judge of their morality. He looks like an old traveling beggar. Dievas Senelis is proficient at magic and medicine. Epithet of Dievas.
Gabija, the foster of the Holy Fire, a goddess, a daughter of Dievas  ("dievaitė").
Laima, goddess of Fate and pregnant women.
Mėnuo, the Moon, a son of Dievas  ("dievaitis").
Perkūnas, the Thunder, the main god.  ("dievaitis") (Parjanya/Indra in Vedic religion).
Praamžius, Praamžis, Pramšans, Pramžimas,  Praamžimas, an epithet of Dievas (the chief god); probably of later literary origin.
Saulė, the Sun Goddess (Surya in Vedic religion)
Vakarinė, goddess of the Evening Star.
Vėjopatis, god of the wind and master of Dausos (paradise)
Žemyna, goddess, the deified soil (Thracian Zemele; Zamin in Persian and Hindi for "land").
Žvaigždės (singular: žvaigždė), stars. Saulė (the sun) is their mother and sometimes with the Moon as their father. One of the most important stars is Aušrinė. Other stars, Aušrinė's sisters, are less important, but they sometimes appear in mythic stories too. Especially notable ones are Vakarinė or Vakarė (the evening Venus, who makes the bed for Saulė), Indraja (Jupiter), Sėlija (Saturn), Žiezdrė (Mars), and Vaivora (Mercury).

Heroes and heroines
Pajauta, the legendary princess of Kernavė
Jūratė and Kastytis are heroes of a Lithuanian legend, which subsequently became popular, mostly because of its modern poetic interpretation by Maironis. The queen of the amber palace Jūratė may be considered a manifestation of the goddess of Sea in this legend.

Local and nature spirits
Ežerinis, a spirit of lakes
Javinė, a household goddess who protects grain in barns.
Jievaras, a household spirit who protects grain. Sacrifices to Jievaras are made after the rye harvest. While cutting grain, women would leave a few grain tufts uncut, which would later be braided into plaits. They would also leave some bread and salt under the plait, and would say: Davei manei, Žemele, duodame ir tau ([You] gave for us, Mother Earth, we are giving for you too), a request for the land to continue to be fruitful.
Kupolė, the spirit of springtime vegetation and flowers. The Festival of Kupolė (Kupolinės) was associated with Feast of St. John the Baptist (Joninės). In this festival, women picked sacral herbs, danced and sang songs. Kupolinės is also known as Rasos. Compare this with Ziedu māte in Latvian mythology, Kupala in Polish mythology and Ivan Kupala in Russian mythology
Laukų dvasios (spirits of fields), spirits, who were running through the fields. When crops in the fields waved in the wind, people saw them as being the actions of spirits. Laukų dvasios include Nuogalis, Kiškis (hare), Meška (bear), Lapė (fox), Katinas (tomcat), Bubis, Bubas, Bubė, Baubas, Babaužis, Bobas, Maumas (bugaboo), Raudongalvis (red-headed), Raudongerklis (red-throated), Žaliaakis (green-eyed), Paplėštakis, Guda, Dizikas, Smauglys (boa), Ruginis (spirit of rye), Papiokė, Pypalas, Žebris, Arklys (horse), Vilkas (wolf).
Upinis, a spirit of rivers

Various lower beings
Kaukas, spirits similar to leprechauns.
Laumė, a fairy-like female creature (pixies). Described as white and blue as the sky itself. Good spirit, very friendly with the Earth and Nature gods. However, if anyone tried to use them for personal gain, their punishment would be severe.
Nykštukas, gnomes.
Vėlės, spirits of dead human beings.

"Demonic" beings
Aitvaras, a household spirit bringing both good and bad luck
Baubas, an evil spirit with long lean arms, wrinkly fingers and red eyes. He harasses people and tears their hair or stifles them. To children, he is the equivalent of the boogeyman of the English-speaking countries. A misbehaving child could be told by the parents: "Behave, or baubas will come and get you". Also it could be described as a black and dark creature living under the carpet or in some dark spot of the house.
Giltinė – goddess of death, also The Reaper. Other names include Kaulinyčia, Maras (black death or the Plague), Maro mergos, Kolera, Pavietrė, Kapinių žmogus. Her sacred bird is the owl. Sometimes she was considered to be a sister of Laima (luck).
Ragana, a forest-dwelling witch.
Slogutis means pain, misery or nightmare. Also can mean fear or bad feelings.
Pinčiukas, devil, not the pure evil being of Christianity, but a trickster. Earlier - dweller or even god of bogs and marshes.
Žiburinis, a scary forest spirit that appears as a phosphorescent skeleton.

Holy places and things
Dausos or Dangus, the home of good souls. Dausos is on a high mountain (Latvian Debeskalns, or Norse Valhalla), between two rivers. There are golden apple-trees in the Dausos garden. Day in the garden is perpetual but outside its confines is perpetual night. Master of Dausos is Vėjopatis (Lord of the wind) or Vėjas (Wind) who is also one of the oldest gods in Lithuanian mythology. Vėjas is identical to Vayu of Hinduism. Auštaras and Vėjopatis are keepers of Dausos's gates (Dausų Vartai). While Auštaras shows the way for good souls, Vėjas (Vėjopatis) blows bad souls into oblivion.

Names by written sources

Earliest Rus' chronicles
Some names from Lithuanian mythology are also found in Kievan Rus' chronicles of the 13th century. These deities were secretly worshiped by King of Lithuania Mindaugas after his baptism. Rus' chronicles are considered the best source of information about the ancient Lithuanian pantheon worshiped by nobles and the military.

Sovijus in 13th-century Rus' chronicles was a person who introduced the pagan custom of burning bodies after death, according to studies by Gintaras Beresnevičius.
Žvoruna (Zvoruna) was a euphemism for the hunting and forest goddess like Roman Diana. Her name is connected with wild animals. There was mentioned in chronicle that she is a bitch, it means that her zoomorphic shape is female dog.
Medeina (Medeinė) is another euphemism of the hunting and forest goddess. Medeina also was mentioned in the 16th century by J. Lasicki. She was worshiped by King Mindaugas and represented military interest of warriors. 
Teliavelis (Televelis) was a powerful smith who made the sun and threw it to the sky. This myth survived in folk tales in the beginning of the 20th century. Some scholars, like K. Būga, tried to prove that Televelis is incorrectly written Kalvelis (smith diminutive in Lithuanian). Teliavelis has connections with Finnish Ilmarinen.
Andajus (Andajas, Andojas, etc.) was mentioned in medieval chronicles as the supreme deity. It may be euphemism for Dievas. It is mentioned in chronicle that warriors invoke Andajus in battle.
Nonadievis (Nunadievis; etimologized by some scholars as Numadievis) is an incorrectly written name of the supreme god or just another euphemism.
Perkūnas was the god of thunder, one of the most powerful deities. Perkūnas survived in popular belief and folk tales until the 20th century.
Diviriks is thought to be one of Perkūnas' euphemisms, meaning "leader of gods".

Martynas Mažvydas
Martynas Mažvydas in his Latin introduction to Catechismusa Prasty Szadei (1547) urged the people to abandon their pagan ways and mentioned the following gods:
Perkūnas (Percuno) – god of thunder
Laukosargas (Laucosargus) – god of grains and other agricultural plants
Žemėpatis (Semepates) – god of cattle and other farm animals
Aitvaras and kaukas (Eithuaros and Caucos) – evil spirits

Maciej Stryjkowski
Maciej Stryjkowski (1547–1593) – Polish–Lithuanian historian and author of Chronicle of Poland, Lithuania, Samogitia and all Russia. In this work, Stryjkowski provided two lists of gods, one Old Prussian and another Lithuanian. He listed 16 Lithuanian gods:

Prakorimas (Prokorimos) – the supreme deity. Stryjkowski elaborated that people used to sacrifice white cocks to Prakorimas. Their flesh was divided into three pieces: one for peasants, another for pagan priests (Lithuanian: žynys), and a third for burning. Stryjkowski pointed out that Prakorimas was similar to the Prussian supreme god Okopirmas.
Rūgutis (Ruguczis) – god of fermentation and fermented foods
Žemininkas (Ziemennik) – god of land and agriculture. The cult of the žaltys (grass snake) is associated with the cult of Žemininkas.
Krūminė (Kruminie Pradziu Warpu) – deity of ears, provider of crops
Lietuvonis (Lituwanis) – god of rain
Kauriraris (Chaurirari) – deity of war and warhorses. The name etymology is unclear. Vladimir Toporov suggested that it is derived from the Lithuanian word kaurai (fur), while Wilhelm Mannhardt argued it stems from karas (war).
Sutvaras (Sotwaros) – god of all cattle
Šeimos dievas (Seimi Dewos) – god of family
Upinis dievas (Upinis Dewos) – god of rivers
Bubilas – god of honey and bees
Didis Lado (Dzidzis Lado) – the great god. Festivities, songs, and dances in his honor lasted from May 25 to June 25. There are doubts whether this represents an actual god.
Gulbis (Gulbi Dzievos) – the good spirit of every human, guardian angel
Ganiklis (Goniglis Dziewos) – god of herds and shepherds
Šventpaukštinis (Swieczpunscynis) – god of all domesticated and wild birds. People did not offer sacrifices to him as he was a free spirit.
Kelių dievas (Kielu Dziewos) – god of roads, trade and travel
Pušaitis or Puškaitis (Puszajtis) – deity of land, dwelling in elder bushes and commanding chthonic dwarfs (barstukas)

Jan Łasicki
Jan Łasicki (Lasicius) was a Polish Protestant activist. He wrote a treatise on idolatry About the gods of Samogitians, other Sarmatians, and false Christians (De diis Samagitarum caeterorumque Sarmatarum et falsorum Christianorum, written ca. 1582 and published in 1615). This 18-page treatise contained a lists of 76 Lithuanian gods with brief description of their functions. Łasicki obtained most of his information from Łaszkowski, a Polish lesser noble who worked as a royal land surveyor. The list contained very minor deities, representing everyday household items. Łasicki was also not intimately familiar with Lithuanian culture or language. Therefore, the academic opinion on the list ranges from a valuable resource to a practical joke designed to poke fun of Christian saints through an inverted mirror. Deities mentioned by Jan Łasicki were:
 Aukštėjas (Auxtheias Vissagistis) – a euphemism for the supreme god. Derived from the Lithuanian word aukštas (high).
 Žemėpatis (Zemopacios)
 Perkūnas (Percunos) – god of thunder
 Audros – god of storms
 Algis
 Aušra (Ausca) – the morning star (Venus). Her other name was Aušrinė.
 Bežlėja (Bezlea)
 Brėkšta (Breksta) – goddess of twilight. Also could be a euphemism for Vakarė.
 Ligyčius (Ligiczus)
 Datanus
 Kirnis (Kirnus) – local god of cherries
 Kremata – god of hogs
 Pyzius (Pizio) – god of spouses
 Medeina (Modeina et Ragaina) – goddess of forest and hunting
 Kerpyčius and Šilinytis (Kierpiczus and Siliniczus) – gods of forest, mosses and lichens
 Tavalas (Tavvals) – deity of physical strength. Gintaras Beresnevičius noted that this deity could be the same as medieval Teliavelis.
 Orthus
 Ežerinis (Ezernim) – spirit or deity of lakes. Derived from ežeras (lake).
 Sidžius, Simonaitis and Ventis Rekičionis (Simonaitem, Sidzium, Ventis Rekicziouum) – spirits worshiped by individual noble families
 Karvaitis Ėraitinis (Kurvvaiczin Eraiczin) – deity of calves and lambs
 Gardūnytis (Gardunithis) – protector of newly born lambs
 Prigirstytis (Prigirstitis) – can hear whispers
 Derintojas (Derfintos)
 Bentis
 Laukpatis (Lavukpatimo)
 Priparšis (Priparscis)
 Ratainyčia (Ratainicza) – god of horses
 Valgina (Walgina) – god of cattle
 Krikštas (Kriksthos) – protector of tombstones
 Apydėmė (Apidome) – deity of changed residence. The name is also known from hand-written collection of sermons from 1573.
 Kriukis (Krukis) – deity of pigs
 Lazdona (Lasdona) – goddess of hazelnuts
 Bubilas (Babilos) – household god of bees, husband of Austėja
 Žemyna (Zemina) – goddess of land and agriculture
 Austėja (Austheia) – household goddess of bees, often presented as wife of Bubilas
 Deuoitis
 Vetustis
 Guboi and Tvverticos
 Veliuona (Vielona) – goddess of death
 Warpulis
 Salaus – no function recorded by Łasicki.
 Šluotražis (Szlotrazis) – no function recorded by Łasicki. The name is derived from šluota (broom).
 Tiklis – no function recorded by Łasicki.
 Beržulis (Birzulis) – no function recorded by Łasicki. Based on etymology, it could be a god of birches and birch sap.
 Šeryčius (Siriczus) – no function recorded by Łasicki. The name is possibly derived from šerti (feed).
 Dvargantis (Dvvargonth) – no function recorded by Łasicki.
 Klamals – no function recorded by Łasicki.
 Atlaibas (Atlaibos) – no function recorded by Łasicki.
 Numeias
 Ublanyčia (Vblanicza) – patron of beggars
 Dugnai – spirit of flour
 Pesseias
 Trotytojas kibirkščių (Tratitas Kirbixtu) – deity of spark, fire
 Alabathis
 Polengabia
 Užpelenė (Aspelenie)
 Budintojas (Budintaia)
 Matergabiae
 Raugo Žemėpatis (Rauguzemapati) – deity of sourdough, leaven and fermentation
 Luibegeldas
 Ziemennik
 Vaižgantas (Waizganthos) – a god of flax
 Gabija (Gabie) – goddess of household fire
 Smik smik per velėną (Smik Smik Perleuenu) – a phrase rather than a being
 Ežiagalis (Ezagulis) – god of death
 Aitvaras (Aitvvaros)
 Kaukas (Kaukie)
 Gyvatė (Giuoitos) – black snake (see also žaltys)
 Srutis and Miechutele – deities of paint and color

Matthäus Prätorius
Deities mentioned by Matthäus Prätorius (1635–1704) were:

 Žalius (Zallus) – god of disagreement
 Žėlius (Zelus) – god of grass
 Šulininis (Szullinnijs) – god of wells
 Bangpūtys, Vėjopatis, Bičbirbis, Giltinė, Gota, Jaučių Baubis, Karvaitis, Ėraitis, Skalsa, Biržulis / Beržulis, Prigirstytis / Girystis, Ligyčius / Lygėjus, Kelio dievas / Kelukis
 Drebkulis and Magyla - Prussian Lithuanian
 Gabjauja (Gabvartas)

Theodor Narbutt
Polish-Lithuanian historian Theodor Narbutt wrote the ten-volume work History of the Lithuanian Nation (Dzieje starożytne narodu litewskiego) between 1835 and 1841. The first volume contained a description of Lithuanian mythology. However, modern historians have accused Narbutt of falsifying historical facts and reporting speculations. Thus, some gods mentioned only by Narbutt and unknown from other sources are usually treated as inventions of the author.

Male deities
Praamžius (Pramżimas) – highest god, determines the fate of people, world, and other gods
Ukapirmas (Okkapirmas) – preceded time, his feast is celebrated on December 25
Viršaitis (Wirszajtos) – protected household, domestic animals. Narbutt claimed that he was equivalent to Auxtejas Wissagistis mentioned by Łasicki and to Roman Saturn
Perkūnas (Perkunas) – thunder god
Kovas (Kawas) – god of war
Ragutis – god of beer, vodka, mead
Santvaras or Sotvaras (Sotwaros) – god of daylight, poets, doctors
Atrimpas (Atrimpos) – god of sea and water
Gardaitis (Gardeoldiis) – god of wind, storm, protector of ships
Poklius (Poklus) – god of death and underworld
Kriukis (Krugis) – god of smiths
Žiemininkas (Ziemienikas) – god of earth, harvest, and darkness
Patelas (Patelo) – flying god of air, similar to an angel
Šneibratas (Sznejbrato) – god of birds and hunting
Kibirai (Kabiry) – a trinity

Female deities

Praurimė (Praurime) – goddess of sacred fire, she was served by vaidilutės
Lada (Lado) – the great goddess, Rasos festival is dedicated to her
Budtė (Budte) – goddess of wisdom
Laima (Lajma) – goddess of fate
Pelenų Gabija (Polengabia) – goddess of fireplaces
Moterų Gabija (Matergabia) – goddess of bread and bakery
Perkūnaitėlė (Perkunatele) – wife of Perkūnas
Pilvytė (Pilwite) – goddess of money, riches, and good luck
Lietuva (Liethua) – goddess of freedom, pleasure, joy
Veliuona (Wellona) – goddess of eternity, afterlife
Pergrubė (Pergrubie) – goddess of spring, flowers, gardens
Milda – goddess of love, courtship
Krūminė (Krumine) – goddess of grain, agriculture
Nijolė (Nijola) – mistress of the underworld, wife of Poklius
Alabatis – goddess of flax
Aušra (Ausssra) – morning goddess
Bezelea – evening goddess
Brėkšta (Brekszta) – goddess of darkness and dreams
Kruonis (Kronis) – goddess of time
Užsparinė (Usparinia) – goddess of land borders
Verpėja (Werpeja) – weaver of the thread of life
Gondu – goddess of weddings
Upinė (Upine) – goddess of rivers, springs
Ratainyčia (Ratajniczu) – goddess protecting horses
Valginė (Walgina) – goddess protecting domestic animals
Luobo gelda (Lajbegelda) – goddess of knowledge and rumors
Mėšlų boba (Mahslu baba) – goddess of garbage
Budintoja – spirit that wakes sleeping people
Austėja (Austheja) – goddess of bees
Ragutiene Pati (Ragutenapati) – wife of Ragutis
Žemės Motina (Zemmes mahti) – goddess of underground, responsible for lost items
Gaila (Gajla) – spirit torturing people and animals
Neris – nymph of Neris River
Dugnė (Dugna) – nymph of rivers
Ragana – goddess of trees
Lazdona – goddess of hazelnut
Medziojna – goddess of forests
Pajauta – worshiped woman, daughter of Duke Kernius, wife of Živinbudas
Birutė (Biruta) – worshiped woman, wife of Kęstutis

Other written sources
This section contains those names of Lithuanian and Prussian gods or other mythical beings that are mentioned in old treatises on history or philosophy, sometimes accompanied by brief descriptions, and which are known from a few independent sources or from their counterparts under different names in later collections of myths and tales.

Dimstipatis (mentioned by Jokūbas Lavinskis), is a masculine deity (genius loci). It is a household god, the guardian of houses and caretaker of the hearth. People sacrificed roosters and black hens to the deity. The birds were boiled; later people would gather around the kettle and eat the birds. The bones were burned. Sometimes Dimstipatis is reconstructed as a god of housewives, to whom pigs were sacrificed. Dimstipatis was also seen as a power protecting from fires.
 Dirvolika, Nosolus (Jesuit reports from 1605)
Pagirnis (Jesuit reports from 1605)
Baukuris (Kraziu kolegijos)
Velinas (mentioned by Konstantinas Sirvydas)
Javinė (Jawinne by Jacob Brodowski)
Laima (Daniel Klein in 1666)

Other names
Names of figures that were more marginal in Lithuanian mythology or less known from existing sources are put here. In fact they denote some spirits or local deities that do not play a main role in the mythology of Lithuanians. 
Blizgulis, a god of snow. His name means "He who sparkles."
Junda, Goddess of War
Baubis, a household god of meat and cattle.
Divytis, a god-like hero of fishermen legends. Fishermen at sea sang songs about Divytis.
Gardaitis, a god (a spirit?) of ships and sailors.
Jagaubis, a household spirit of fire and the furnace.
Rasa, Kupolė's and Kaupolis' daughter. She is the goddess of summer's greenage and flowers.
Mokas, a stone with an ability to teach people, sometimes they are found in families - with wife Mokienė and children Mokiukas

See also
Proto-Indo-European mythology
Indo-European cosmogony
Latvian mythology
Lithuanian mythology
Prussian mythology
Romuva (temple)

References

Further reading
 Lithuanian Religion and Mythology by Gintaras Beresnevičius

 Gintaras Beresnevičius on periodisation and Gods in Lithuanian mythology.
Algirdas Julien Greimas, "Of Gods and Men: Studies in Lithuanian Mythology", Indiana Univ. Press (November 1992)
 Koženiauskienė, Regina. "Metaforinė ąžuolo kulto raiška lietuvių etnokultūroje: pagal žemaičių legendą "Baublys"" [Metaphorical expression of the oak cult in the Lithuanian ethnic culture: according to the Samogitian story "Baublys”]. In: Lituanistica 2012, Nr. 1, pp. 63–74. .

Lithuanian gods
Gods
Mythological figures
Baltic gods